William Davis was an American baseball left fielder in the Negro leagues. He played with the St. Louis Stars in 1937. In some sources, his statistics are combined with Spencer Davis. During World War II, Davis served with the US Army at Fort Benning, Georgia.

References

External links
 and Seamheads

St. Louis Stars (1937) players
Baseball outfielders
Year of birth missing
Year of death missing
African Americans in World War II
United States Army personnel of World War II
African-American United States Army personnel